Michael J. Lewis (born March 18, 1946) is a retired American professional basketball player.

A 6'8" power forward/center from Duke University, Lewis played in the American Basketball Association from 1968 to 1974 as a member of the Indiana Pacers, Minnesota Pipers, Pittsburgh Pipers, Pittsburgh Condors, and Carolina Cougars. He averaged 12.1 points per game and 11.9 rebounds per game in his ABA career and appeared in the 1971 ABA All-Star Game. His career was cut short by an Achilles tendon injury.

References

1946 births
Living people
All-American college men's basketball players
American men's basketball players
Basketball players from Montana
Boston Celtics draft picks
Carolina Cougars players
Duke Blue Devils men's basketball players
Indiana Pacers players
Minnesota Pipers players
Parade High School All-Americans (boys' basketball)
Pittsburgh Condors players
Pittsburgh Pipers players
Power forwards (basketball)
Sportspeople from Missoula, Montana